Muria may refer to:
Muria people of India
Muria language
Maria language (India)
Muria, Bihar, a village in India
Mount Muria, a dormant volcano in Indonesia

See also
 Murias (disambiguation)

Language and nationality disambiguation pages